Santiago Bernabéu de Yeste (8 June 1895 – 2 June 1978) was a Spanish footballer who played for Real Madrid as a forward. He is widely regarded one of the most important figures in the history of Real Madrid, having served as its president for 35 years, from 11 September 1943 until his death in 1978.

Under Bernabéu's leadership, Real Madrid became a dominant team both on national and international level, with its influence stretching beyond the football pitch. The club's current stadium is named in his honour.

Early years and career
Bernabéu was born in Almansa, Albacete, Spain. His family moved to Madrid when he was very young, and Bernabéu himself joined the Real Madrid junior ranks in 1909 at age 14, after being a regular spectator at their matches for years. Bernabéu wore the captain's armband for years. In 1920, Santiago Bernabéu withdrew from Real Madrid and went on to join their city rival Atlético Madrid, with whom he would only play one game. In 1921, he returned to Real Madrid, playing as a striker before retiring from playing in 1926. He continued to be associated with the club until 1935, first as manager of the first team, then as a director and later becoming assistant manager.

Civil War
With the outbreak of the Spanish Civil War in 1936, professional football ceased to be played in Spain. During the war, Bernabéu fought on the side of Francisco Franco's Nationalists under the general Agustín Muñoz Grandes.

Post-Civil War
After the war, Bernabéu proceeded to spend the next several months finding and contacting former players, directors, and club members, eventually restructuring the club.
 
In 1943, Bernabéu was elected president of Real Madrid – a position he would occupy until his death on 2 June 1978, beginning to implant his ideas. He restructured the club at all levels, in what would become the normal operating structure of professional clubs in the future, giving every section and level of the club independent technical teams and recruiting people who were ambitious and visionary in their own right, such as Raimundo Saporta.
   
He then endeavoured to build what would become the stadium that today bears his name, at the time the largest stadium in all of Europe. The Ciudad Deportiva, built so that the players could train without damaging the stadium's pitch, was also constructed during these years. Finally, he embarked upon an ambitious strategy of signing world-class players from Spain and abroad, the most prominent of them being the signing of Alfredo Di Stéfano. During Bernabéu's presidency many of Real Madrid's most legendary names played for the club, including Molowny, Muñoz, Di Stéfano, Gento, Rial, Santamaría, Kopa, Puskás, Amancio, Pirri, Netzer, Santillana, Juanito, Camacho, del Bosque, and many others. With this legendary team, Real Madrid would go on to usher in an unprecedented era of dominance both domestically and internationally, highlighted by its five consecutive European Cup triumphs and numerous domestic titles.

Influence in Europe and legacy
In 1955, acting upon the idea proposed by the L'Équipe journalist Gabriel Hanot and building upon the Copa Latina (a tournament involving clubs from France, Spain, Portugal, and Italy), Bernabéu met in the Ambassador Hotel in Paris with Bedrignan and Gustav Sebes and created what was at first a loosely constructed tournament played among invited teams, but which over time developed into what is today the Champions League. Under the administration of UEFA, it is the world's premier club tournament.
   
Bernabéu helped Manchester United rebuild its team following the Munich air disaster in 1958.

At the time of his death, Bernabéu had been the club's president for 35 years, during which his club won 1 Intercontinental Cup, 6 European Cups, 16 league titles, 6 Spanish Cups, 2 Latin Cups, and 1 Copa Eva Duarte. He died in 1978, while the World Cup was being played in Argentina. In his honour FIFA decreed three days of mourning during the tournament. In 2002, he was posthumously awarded the FIFA Order of Merit.

References

External links

Profile at realmadrid.com

1895 births
1978 deaths
People from Almansa
Sportspeople from the Province of Albacete
Spanish footballers
Footballers from Castilla–La Mancha
Association football forwards
Real Madrid Castilla footballers
Real Madrid CF players
Spanish football managers
Atlético Madrid footballers
Real Madrid CF managers
Real Madrid CF presidents